Nescopeck may refer to the following:

Nescopeck Mountain, ridge in Columbia County and Luzerne County, in Pennsylvania
Nescopeck Township, Luzerne County, Pennsylvania
Nescopeck, Pennsylvania, a borough in the above township
Nescopeck Creek, a tributary of the Susquehanna River in Luzerne County
Nescopeck State Park, in Luzerne County